This is a list of Virginia suffragists, suffrage groups and others associated with the cause of women's suffrage in Virginia.

Groups 

 Bedford Equal Suffrage League.
 Equal Suffrage League of Fredericksburg.
 Equal Suffrage League of Highland Springs.
 Equal Suffrage League of Lynchburg.
 Equal Suffrage League of Norfolk.
 Equal Suffrage League of Williamsburg.
 Equal Suffrage League of Virginia, formed in 1909.
 Men's Equal Suffrage League of Virginia, formed in 1912.
 Newport News Equal Suffrage League.
 Virginia Beach National Woman's Party.
 Virginia State Federation of Colored Women's Clubs, created in 1907.
 Virginia Suffrage Association (formerly Virginia Suffrage Society) formed in 1893.
Virginia Branch of the Congressional Union for Woman Suffrage formed in 1915.

Suffragists 

 Pauline Adams (Norfolk).
 Lillie Barbour.
 Janie Porter Barrett (Hampton).
 Kate Waller Barrett (Alexandria).
 Ada Whitehead Bodeker.
 Kate Langley Bosher (Richmond).
 Rosa Dixon Bowser (Richmond).
Martha Haines Butt.
Anne Atkinson Burmeister Chamberlayne
 Adèle Clark (Richmond).
Mary Ellen Pollard Clarke
 Elizabeth Cooke (Norfolk).
 Edith Clark Cowles (Richmond).
 Anne Clay Crenshaw (Richmond).
Blanche Culpeper
 Janet Stuart Oldershaw Durham
 Janetta R. Fitzhugh (Fredericksburg).
 Ellen Glasgow (Richmond).
 Nora Houston (Richmond).
 Maude Jamison (Norfolk).
Julia S. Jennings
 Eugenia Jobson.
 Maria I. Johnston (Fredericksburg).
 Mary Johnston (Richmond).
Emma Lee Kelley
 Fannie Bayly King.
 Orra Gray Langhorne (Lynchburg).
Elizabeth Langhorne Lewis
 Mary Morris Hall Lockwood
 Lucy Randolph Mason (Richmond).
 Nell Mercer (Norfolk).
 Sophie G. Meredith (Richmond).
 Faith W. Morgan.
 Mary-Cooke Branch Munford (Richmond).
Josephine Mathews Norcom
 Elizabeth Lewis Otey
 Rosewell Page.
 Millie Paxton (Roanoke).
 Mary Elizabeth Pidgeon.
Mary Bell Perkins
 Agnes Dillon Randolph (Richmond).
 Eudora Ramsay Richardson.
 Sally Nelson Robins (Richmond).
 Ellen Robinson.
 Ora Brown Stokes.
 Alice Overbey Taylor.
 Ida Mae Thompson (Richmond).
 Clayton Torrence.
 Jessie Fremont Easton Townsend (Norfolk).
 Lyon G. Tyler (Williamsburg).
 Lila Meade Valentine (Richmond).
 Maggie L. Walker (Richmond).
Roberta Wellford
Annie Barna Whitner
 Sarah Harvie Wormeley.
 Eugenie Macon Yancey (Bedford).

Politicians supporting women's suffrage 

 Richard Lewis Brewer, Jr.
Charles Carlin (originally opposed)
Howard T. Colvin.
 Howard Cecil Gilmer.
 Thomas Lomax Hunter.
 Allan Jones.
 Wyndham R. Mayo (Norfolk).
 Hill Montague (Richmond).
John Garland Pollard
John R. Saunders
Elbert Lee Trinkle
Junius E. West

Places 

 Occoquan Workhouse.
 Three Hills.

Publications 

 The Virginia Suffrage News, published monthly starting in 1914. Managed by Alice Overbey Taylor.

Suffragists who campaigned in Virginia 

 Susan B. Anthony.
 William Jennings Bryan.
 Carrie Chapman Catt.
 Pauline Wright Davis.
 Matilda Joslyn Gage.
 Joy Montgomery Higgins.
 Josephine Miller.
 Mabel Vernon.
 Emma Howard Wight.
 Elizabeth Upham Yates.

Anti-suffragists in Virginia 

 Maria Blair (Richmond).
 Jane M. Rutherford.
Molly Elliot Seawell
Catherine Coles Valentine
Mary Mason Anderson Williams
Margaret Wilmer
Politicians

 Harry Flood Byrd
Robert Franklin Leedy.

Groups

 Virginia Association Opposed to Woman Suffrage (VAOWS), formed in 1912.

See also 

 Timeline of women's suffrage in Virginia
 Women's suffrage in Virginia
 Women's suffrage in the United States

References

Sources

External links 
 Suffragists in Virginia History
We Demand: Women's Suffrage in Virginia
Virginia Suffrage issues available online via Virginia Chronicle

Virginia suffrage

Virginia suffragists
Activists from Virginia
History of Virginia
Lists of people from Virginia